Stephen Powell (born 7 September 1976) is a former Australian rules footballer in the Australian Football League (AFL).

A journeyperson in the AFL, Powell made his debut with the Western Bulldogs as a 20-year-old in 1997.
He quickly became known as a player whose hardness and aggression at the ball was invaluable, continuing this role as the Bulldogs reached preliminary finals in 1997 and 1998. 
Surprisingly,  at the end of 1999 he was traded went to the Melbourne Football Club  much to the dismay of Bulldogs fans, where he immediately became a major contributor in helping them reach a Grand Final in 2000. Despite a bad loss, he was a shining light on the day and the Demons.
Powell polled strongly in their Best and Fairest at the end of the year. He missed all of 2001  with a nearly career ending groin injury.
2002 saw him return to play, and he returned to fine form. At the end of the season, protracted contract negotiations saw him nominate to leave the club through the pre-season draft,  this time to the St Kilda Football Club.

His experience at the Saints was invaluable to their young and developing list,  and he was an often underrated  player in a midfield that included stars such as Lenny Hayes, Robert Harvey and Nick Dal Santo
Such was his contribution that season, he finished third in the Trevor Barker Award .

Powell to play in St Kilda's 2004 Wizard Home Loans Cup winning side.

In 2005, however, Powell's career hit a hurdle. Returning from injury in Round 9 he never quite reached the level of consistency of 2003, and lack of pace then became an issue, although he was a regular first team member. At the end of the year there were doubts about the future of the just-turned-29 Powell, but he later signed a one-year contract, meaning a sharp downward turn in speed and form limited Powell's chances.

2006 was Powell's last season of football, playing only 10 matches and announcing his retirement, in September, a week after St Kilda's exit from the 2006 AFL Finals Series.

References

External links 

1976 births
Living people
St Kilda Football Club players
Western Bulldogs players
Melbourne Football Club players
People educated at St Kevin's College, Melbourne
Australian rules footballers from Victoria (Australia)
Sandringham Dragons players